Dihydroxycinnamic acid may refer to several molecules with the molecular formula C9H8O4 including:
 Caffeic acid (3,4-Dihydroxycinnamic acid), a hydroxycinammic acid
 Umbellic acid (2,4-dihydroxycinnamic acid), a hydroxycinammic acid
 2,3-Dihydroxycinnamic acid, a hydroxycinammic acid
 2,5-Dihydroxycinnamic acid, a hydroxycinammic acid
 3,5-Dihydroxycinnamic acid, a hydroxycinammic acid